VH1 MegaHits was a Latin American pay television music channel. It was owned by ViacomCBS Networks Brazil, subsidiary of ViacomCBS Networks Americas and aired music videos throughout its entire day.

VH1 MegaHits featured four different blocks of programming: In Motion, Nothing But Classics, VH1 Shuffle and Moods. It was somewhat equivalent to MTV Hits in its programming style, though the latter also featured artists interviews and album/music video recording featurettes, whereas VH1 MegaHits was completely dependent on music videos.

The network launched as MTV Hits in Brazil on 22 June 2005, and was re-branded as VH1 MegaHits on 29 January 2010 after a local re-configuration of Viacom's domestic properties in Brazil.

In Brazil, by decision of Viacom, the channel was manually replaced by MTV Live HD on 31 July 2020 in most TV providers that didn't have the channel yet.

VH1 MegaHits had its signal switched off on 31 August 2020, one day after the broadcast of the 2020 MTV VMAs. As well as MTV Hits US, the channel was directly replaced by NickMusic on August 31, 2020. The last music video played on the channel was "Bulletproof" by La Roux.

VH1 MegaHits in the United States

VH1 MegaHits in the United States was a fully automated music video channel which played mostly top 40 adult contemporary videos from throughout VH1's history, from the '80s to the early years of the 21st century. It shared the same eight-hour automated loop schedule that VH1 Classic and VH1 Country also had at the time. As with its sister networks, it was exclusive to digital cable and never had any satellite service carriage.

Due to low viewership and cable carriage, the channel was discontinued at the end of June 2005. The satellite space was used by corporate parent MTV Networks to launch Logo, a subscription network targeted at the gay community. Logo TV previously aired two music video-based programs, NewNowNext Music and The Click List: Top 10 Videos.

See also
 VH1 Brasil
 Logo, the successor of VH1 MegaHits in the United States

Music video networks in the United States
Television channels and stations established in 2001
Television channels and stations disestablished in 2020
Defunct television networks in the United States
VH1